Wilkinson County is a county located in the central portion of the U.S. state of Georgia. As of the 2020 census, the population was 8,877. The county seat is Irwinton. The county was created on May 11, 1803, and named for General James Wilkinson (1757–1825).

Geography
The county is located mainly in the upper Atlantic coastal plain region of the state, but does have some rolling hills due to its close proximity to the fall line.

The entirety of Wilkinson County is located in the Lower Oconee River sub-basin of the Altamaha River basin.

Major highways

  U.S. Route 80
  U.S. Route 441
  State Route 18
  State Route 18 Spur
  State Route 19
  State Route 29
  State Route 57
  State Route 96
  State Route 112
  State Route 243
  State Route 540 (Fall Line Freeway)

Adjacent counties
 Baldwin County (north)
 Bleckley County (south)
 Washington County (northeast)
 Johnson County (east)
 Laurens County (southeast)
 Twiggs County (southwest)
 Jones County (northwest)

Demographics

2000 census
As of the census of 2000, there were 10,220 people, 3,827 households, and 2,805 families living in the county.  The population density was 23 people per square mile (9/km2).  There were 4,449 housing units at an average density of 10 per square mile (4/km2).  The racial makeup of the county was 57.96% White, 40.70% Black or African American, 0.21% Native American, 0.07% Asian, 0.40% from other races, and 0.66% from two or more races.  0.99% of the population were Hispanic or Latino of any race.

There were 3,827 households, out of which 33.70% had children under the age of 18 living with them, 50.60% were married couples living together, 18.40% had a female householder with no husband present, and 26.70% were non-families. 24.10% of all households were made up of individuals, and 10.40% had someone living alone who was 65 years of age or older.  The average household size was 2.65 and the average family size was 3.13.

In the county, the population was spread out, with 27.20% under the age of 18, 9.00% from 18 to 24, 28.10% from 25 to 44, 22.70% from 45 to 64, and 13.10% who were 65 years of age or older.  The median age was 36 years. For every 100 females there were 90.60 males.  For every 100 females age 18 and over, there were 88.10 males.

The median income for a household in the county was $32,723, and the median income for a family was $39,349. Males had a median income of $31,814 versus $21,461 for females. The per capita income for the county was $14,658.  About 14.60% of families and 17.90% of the population were below the poverty line, including 24.90% of those under age 18 and 18.00% of those age 65 or over.

2010 census
As of the 2010 United States Census, there were 9,563 people, 3,666 households, and 2,638 families living in the county. The racial makeup of the county was 58.5% white, 38.4% black or African American, 0.3% Asian, 0.3% American Indian, 1.3% from other races, and 1.1% from two or more races. Those of Hispanic or Latino origin made up 2.2% of the population. In terms of ancestry, and 14.7% were American.

Of the 3,666 households, 33.6% had children under the age of 18 living with them, 47.9% were married couples living together, 18.3% had a female householder with no husband present, 28.0% were non-families, and 24.8% of all households were made up of individuals. The average household size was 2.58 and the average family size was 3.06. The median age was 41.1 years.

The median income for a household in the county was $37,902 and the median income for a family was $49,138. Males had a median income of $39,009 versus $25,935 for females. The per capita income for the county was $17,929. About 17.9% of families and 23.1% of the population were below the poverty line, including 35.1% of those under age 18 and 21.9% of those age 65 or over.

2020 census

As of the 2020 United States census, there were 8,877 people, 3,185 households, and 2,079 families residing in the county.

Education

Wilkinson County Primary/Elementary School

Wilkinson County Middle/High School

Wilkinson County is home of the 9-time state high school basketball class A champions.

Communities
 Allentown
 Danville
 Gordon
 Irwinton (county seat)
 Ivey
 McIntyre
 Nicklesville
 Stephensville
 Toomsboro

Politics
Wilkinson County voted for every Democratic presidential nominee from 1828 to 1960; note that 1828 was the first year in which Georgia held a popular vote for presidential electors and also the first year in which the Democratic Party ran a presidential candidate. However, there was at least one example of Republican success in the county during Reconstruction: in the 1868 gubernatorial election, which was held in April, the Republican ticket swept the county, with Rufus Bullock receiving 59% of the vote; the Republican candidate for county ordinary won by just 1.7%. Decades later, in the 1948 presidential election Harry Truman only won the county by one vote from States’ Rights candidate Strom Thurmond.

In 1964, Wilkinson County voted overwhelmingly for Barry Goldwater, the first Republican presidential nominee to win the county. It also delivered large victories to segregationist American Independent Party candidate George Wallace and Republican Richard Nixon in 1968 and 1972 respectively. In the presidential elections of both 1976 and 1980, former Georgia governor Jimmy Carter, a Democrat, won the county easily.

In 1984, Democrat Walter Mondale won the county by a 9% margin, which was only the second presidential result in the county within 30% since 1912. This was also the first time since 1848, when Whig Zachary Taylor narrowly won Georgia, that the county voted for a presidential candidate who did not win the state. In the following three presidential elections, Wilkinson continued to give Democratic candidates between 53% and 59% of the vote.

In 2000, Al Gore won Wilkinson County by a margin of 1.3%, or 84 votes, receiving 50.4% to George W. Bush's 48.1%. The county then voted for all three Republican nominees from 2004 to 2012, each time by a margin of less than 1.5%. In 2016, it voted for Donald Trump by a margin of just over 10%. Wilkinson was thus one of many counties in Georgia's historic black belt that demonstrated a significant swing in favor of Republican presidential candidates from 2012 to 2016. Similarly, the county swung from a 0.25% victory for the 2014 Democratic gubernatorial nominee to an 11.63% victory for the 2018 Republican gubernatorial nominee.

Even as it has become more favorable to Republicans at the state and federal level, Wilkinson's county government continues to be dominated by Democrats, to the extent that the Democratic primary is often tantamount to election. In 2016, Democrats won all six county executive offices without Republican opposition, as well as the three school board seats up for election that year. While the Republican district attorney for the district that includes Wilkinson was also unopposed, he received only 65.6% of ballots cast, compared to at least 72.4% for each unopposed Democratic countywide official. In 2018, Democratic incumbents were reelected unopposed to two of the county's five commission seats unopposed and to a third seat by a 25% margin, as well as winning the race for commission chair unopposed. The Democratic candidate in the open first commission district lost, but by just 2.7%. Both school board members up that year were unopposed Democratic incumbents.

Similarly, the overwhelming majority of primary voters in Wilkinson have chosen Democratic ballots even in recent years, presidential primaries excepted. In 2014, 2,022 of 2,174 primary voters (93.0%) chose Democratic ballots. In 2016, 1,726 of 2,033 primary voters (84.9%) did so, and in 2018, 1,186 of the 1,862 primary voters (63.7%) did so, even in the context of a competitive statewide Republican primary for governor. Three incumbent county commissioners faced opponents in their 2018 primaries; the incumbent county commission chair lost, and the District 2 incumbent won by just one vote.

Government
Current county officials:

See also

 National Register of Historic Places listings in Wilkinson County, Georgia
List of counties in Georgia

Notes

References

 
1803 establishments in Georgia (U.S. state)
Georgia (U.S. state) counties
Populated places established in 1803